Everything Glows was the seventh album released by Danish rock band D-A-D. The album was released on 13 April 2000, and was the first album with new drummer Laust Sonne. With the release of this album the band also changed the spelling of the band from D:A:D to the current D-A-D.

Track listing
"Everything Glows" – 3:44
"Nineteenhundredandyesterday" – 4:59
"The Road Below Me" – 3:37
"Something Good" – 4:19
"Sunstar" – 4:24
"Evil Twin" – 3:07
"Candybar" – 4:29
"A Kiss Between the Legs" – 4:32
"I'm Not the Same" – 3:29
"Summer Me Soon" – 3:30
"As Common As" – 4:23
"Last Mango in Paris" (Japan only bonus track)
"I'm a Little Cloud" (Japan + UK only bonus track)

Charts

References

External links
 This album on D-A-D's official homepage

2000 albums
Albums produced by Nick Foss
D.A.D. (band) albums